William N. Copley (January 24, 1919 – May 7, 1996) also known as CPLY, was an American painter, writer, gallerist, collector, patron, publisher and art entrepreneur. His works as an artist have been classified as late Surrealist and precursory to Pop Art.

Early life and introduction to art 

Copley was born in New York City in 1919 to parents John and Flora Lodwell; they died shortly after in the 1919 Spanish Flu epidemic. Copley was adopted in 1921 by Ira C. Copley, the owner of sixteen newspaper companies in Chicago and San Diego. Ira C. Copley remarried after the death of his wife, Edith, several years after the adoption took place. The three lived in Aurora, Illinois, until Copley was ten years old whereby the family moved to Coronado Island, California.

Copley was sent to Phillips Andover and then Yale University by his adopted parents. He was drafted in the Second World War in the middle of his education at Yale, a decision negotiated by the school and the army. Copley experimented with politics upon returning home from the war, working as a reporter for his father's newspaper.

By 1946, Copley met and married Marjorie Doris Wead, the daughter of a test pilot for the Navy. Doris's sister was married to John Ployardt, a Canadian-born animator and narrator at Walt Disney Studios. Copley and Ployardt soon became friends and Ployardt began introducing Copley to painting and Surrealism. The two traveled to Mexico and New York, discovering art, meeting the artists behind the works, and grasping Surrealist ideas. It was during this time that Copley and Ployardt decided to open a gallery in Los Angeles to exhibit Surrealist works.

Galleries and foundation 
Copley and Ployardt tracked down Man Ray while living in Los Angeles. Ray then introduced them to Marcel Duchamp in New York City. There, Duchamp opened many doors for them, introducing the two to New York dealers in Surrealism. In 1948, Copley and Ployardt opened The Copley Galleries in Beverley Hills, displaying works by artists including René Magritte, Max Ernst, Yves Tanguy, Roberto Matta, Joseph Cornell, and Man Ray. However, Los Angeles had not yet caught on to the Surrealist scene as other locations such as New York City had done, and the Copley Galleries faced hardships in gaining popularity and sales. Copley painted part-time during the gallery's running from the encouragement of friends Duchamp and Ernst and worked on painting full-time when the gallery closed after its first year.

Copley moved to Paris in 1949–50, leaving behind his wife and two children to continue to paint. During his time in Paris, he remained in Surrealist circles and continued to paint with a uniquely American style. Man Ray introduced him to Noma Rathner, whom he married in 1954. Man Ray took numerous portraits of the Copleys and served as best man at their wedding in Paris. Their home in Longpont-sur-Orge in the outskirts of Paris became a central gathering place in the postwar era for a community of Surrealists to reunite after their dispersal during the war. 

The Copleys developed the William and Noma Copley Foundation, later known as the Cassandra Collection, in 1953 with the funds from his father's inheritance. The board, in which Marcel Duchamp was also an adviser, gave small grants to artists and musicians. Upon Duchamp's death in 1968, the William and Noma Copley Foundation (later the Cassandra Foundation) gave Marcel Duchamp's last work, "Etant Donnés" to the Philadelphia Museum of Art, where it is still on view.

Collecting 
From the time of the Copley Galleries until his death, Copley amassed a large collection of artworks with an emphasis on Surrealist works. The basis of his collection started when he began purchasing works that did not sell at the Copley Galleries. From there, he amassed monumental works including Man Ray's "A l'Heure de l'Observatoire – Les Amoureux." Copley's collection was sold at auction in 1979 for $6.7 million, at the time the highest total for the auction of a single owner's collection in the United States.

Artwork and exhibitions 
Copley's first exhibition took place in Los Angeles in 1951 at Royer's Book Shop. From there Copley participated in numerous solo and group exhibitions worldwide. In 1961, Copley was given an exhibition in Amsterdam by the Stedelijk Museum. The museum became the first public institution to add a Copley to their collection.

Copley's paintings throughout the 1950s and 60s dealt with ironic and humorous images of stereotypical American symbols like the Western saloon, cowboys, and pin-up girls combined with flags. His works during this period were often considered a combination of American and Mexican folk art and melded in well with the new young POP movement occurring in America when he returned to New York in the 1960s. Artists like Andy Warhol, Christo, Roy Lichtenstein and many others were frequent visitors at Copley's studio on Lower Broadway. Copley believed that pop art had always interested him, claiming American pop art had much to do with "self-disgust" and "satire."

The Letter Edged in Black Press (SMS) 
In 1967, after a divorce with his second wife, Noma, Copley and new friend Dmitri Petrov decided to publish portfolios of 20th-century artist collaborations with the abbreviation SMS (for "Shit Must Stop"). Copley's Upper West Side loft became a meeting place for performers, artists, curators, and composers to work together on the open-ended collective. The SMS portfolio contained six volumes, each of which were shipped out from the artists to subscribers. The works included came from artists both well-renowned and obscure, including Marcel Duchamp, Roy Lichtenstein, Man Ray, Christo, Richard Hamilton, Claes Oldenburg, John Cage, Terry Riley, La Monte Young, Dick Higgins, Ronnie Landfield, Bruce Nauman, Meret Oppenheim, Neil Jenney, Yoko Ono and others.

CPLY X-Rated 
Copley's works in the 1970s focused on his own understating of differences and challenges between men and women in romantic and sexual relationships. His works were now erotic, even pornographic. In 1974 he exhibited these new works at what was then the New York Cultural Center in Columbus Circle, New York in a show titled "CPLY X-Rated." These pieces were a sudden change from his previous romantic whimsical periods. The American public had difficulty with the material, for which Copley expressed, "Americans... don't know the difference between eroticism and pornography. Because eroticism has always existed in art. And pornography has never necessarily been in art." Copley's experienced greater feedback in Europe, where the work was then well received.  In conjunction with the New York Cultural Center Show, there was a special "CPLY X-Rated Poster and Catalog.

Later years 
Copley moved to Roxbury, Connecticut in 1980, where he built a studio and spent time among friends. In 1992 he moved full-time to Key West, Florida, due to health issues and lived with his sixth and final wife, Cynthia Gooch. He died on May 7, 1996, at age 77 from complications from a stroke he had suffered three weeks earlier.

Mr. Copley's first five marriages ended in divorce. He had a son and two daughters. His daughter, Claire S. Copley, founded the short-lived, but influential Claire Copley Gallery, which exhibited important works by Michael Asher and Bas Jan Ader.

Selected solo exhibitions
2022 "Works on Paper", Galerie Max Hetzler, Berlin
2022 Sadie Coles HQ, London
2020 "The Ballad of William N. Copley", Galerie Max Hetzler, Berlin
2020 "The New York Years", Kasmin, New York
2020 "William N. Copley: The Temptation of St. Anthony (Revisited)", Nino Mier, Los Angeles
2020 "William N. Copley: Drawings and Paintings 1966–1991", Nino Mier, Los Angeles
2018 "William N. Copley: The Coffin They Carry You Off In", Institute of Contemporary Art (ICA), Miami
2018 "Publishing the Portable Museum: William N. Copley’s The Letter Edged in Black Press", Alden Projects, New York
2017 "William N. Copley: Women", Kasmin Gallery, New York (catalogue)
2016 "William N. Copley: The World According to CPLY", The Menil Collection, Houston (travelled to Fondazione Prada, Milan) 
2016 "The World According to CPLY", The Menil Collection, Houston
2015 Galerie 1900-2000, Paris 
2015 "William N. Copley: Drawings (1962 – 1973)", Kasmin Gallery, New York 
2015 "William N. Copley: Paintings from 1960 – 1994", Showroom by Paul van Esch & Partners Art Advisory, Amsterdam
2014 "William N. Copley: Paintings and Mirrors", Michael Fuchs Galerie, Berlin 
2013 "Finally We Laugh", Galerie Linn Lühn, Düsseldorf (catalogue)
2013 "William Copley & Big Fat Black Cock", Inc. Gang Bust, Venus Over Manhattan, New York (catalogue)
2012 "Patriotism of CPLY and All That", Kasmin Gallery, New York
2012  "William N. Copley: Works 1948 – 1983", Galerie Von Braunbehrens, Munich (catalogue)
2012 Museum Frieder Burda, Baden Baden
2011 "X-Rated," Sadie Coles HQ, London
2010 "CPLY: X-Rated," Paul Kasmin Gallery, New York
2004 Musée d'Art Moderne et Contemporain
1980–81 Badischer Kunstverein, Karlsruhe, Germany
Stedelijk Van Abbemuseum, Eindhoven, The Netherlands (traveling retrospective)
Musée National d'Art Moderne, Centre Georges Pompidou, Paris
Kunsthalle Bern
1979 "CPLY: Reflections on a Past Life," Institute of the Arts, Rice University, Houston
1974 "CPLY/X-RATED," New York Cultural Center, New York

Selected group exhibitions

Selected press
Sam, Sherman, "Critics' Pics: William N. Copley at Sadie Coles HQ," Artforum, August 2011.
Laster, Paul, "William N. Copley, 'X-Rated'," Time Out, 12/03/13. 
Smith, Roberta, "Playing the Renegade With Eroticism or Rage," The New York Times, 11/11/10.

Museum and public collections 

Aargauer Kunsthaus, Aarau 
Allen Memorial Art Museum, Oberlin
Art Institute of Chicago, Chicago  
Carleton University Art Gallery, Ottawa
Centre Pompidou, Paris 
Denver Art Museum, Denver 
Destina Foundation, New York
Falckenberg Collection, Hamburg 
Fondazione Prada, Milan 
Goetz Collection, Munich 
International Centre Of Graphic Arts, Ljubljana 
Israel Museum, Jerusalem 
Lenbachhaus, Munich
Los Angeles County Museum of Art, Los Angeles
Maremont Collection, Chicago
Menil Collection, Houston 
Moderna Museet, Stockholm 
Musée d'art moderne et contemporain, Geneva 
Musée d'art moderne et contemporain, Saint-Etienne
Musée de l'Art Moderne de la Ville de Paris, Paris
Museum of Contemporary Art, Chicago, Chicago 
Museum of Contemporary Art, Los Angeles, Los Angeles
Museum of Contemporary Art, North Miami, Miami 
Museum of Modern Art, New York
Museum Ludwig, Cologne 
Museum Moderner Kunst Stiftung Ludwig Wien, Vienna
Museum Ulm, Ulm 
Nagaoka Contemporary Art Museum, Nagaoka 
Newport Harbour Museum, Newport 
Philadelphia Museum of Art, Philadelphia 
Philara Collection, Düsseldorf
Power Institute of Fine Arts, Sydney
Princeton University Art Museum, Princeton
Städel Museum, Frankfurt 
Stedelijk Museum, Amsterdam 
Tate Collection, London 
Whitney Museum of American Art, New York

Notes

1919 births
1996 deaths
American adoptees
American artists
Surrealist artists
Copley family
20th-century American businesspeople
Yale University alumni
Phillips Academy alumni
American art collectors